Hollenstein an der Ybbs is a municipality in the district of Amstetten in Lower Austria in Austria.

Geography
Hollenstein an der Ybbs lies in the Mostviertel on the Ybbs River. About 86 of the municipality is forested.

Literature 
Willibald Bissenberger et al.: Hollenstein an der Ybbs. Ein Dorf im Wandel von etwas mehr als hundert Jahren..., Waidhofen an der Ybbs 2003, .

References

External links 
  Hollensteins famous capricorn 'Seppl' at ORF.at (german)

Cities and towns in Amstetten District